Lampria is a genus of robber flies in the family Asilidae. There are at least 20 described species in Lampria.

Species
These 20 species belong to the genus Lampria:

 Lampria aurifex Osten Sacken, 1887 c g
 Lampria bicincta Walker, 1860 c g
 Lampria bicolor (Wiedemann, 1828) i c g b
 Lampria cilipes Walker, 1857 c g
 Lampria circumdata Bellardi, 1861 c g
 Lampria clavipes (Fabricius, 1805) c g
 Lampria corallogaster (Bigot, 1878) i c g
 Lampria dives (Wiedemann, 1828) c g
 Lampria fulgida Schiner, 1868 c g
 Lampria homopoda (Bellardi, 1862) c g
 Lampria ichneumom (Osten Sacken, 1887) c g
 Lampria macquarti (Perty, 1833) c
 Lampria mexicana Macquart, 1847 c g
 Lampria parvula Bigot, 1878 c g
 Lampria pusilla (Macquart, 1838) c g
 Lampria rubriventris (Macquart, 1834) i c b
 Lampria scapularis Bigot, 1878 c g
 Lampria spinipes (Fabricius, 1805) c g
 Lampria splendens (Macquart, 1834) c g
 Lampria tolmides (Walker, 1849) c g

Data sources: i = ITIS, c = Catalogue of Life, g = GBIF, b = Bugguide.net

References

Further reading

 
 
 

Laphriinae
Asilidae genera
Articles created by Qbugbot